Valeri Leonidovich Barsukov (Валерий Леонидович Барсуков) (March 14, 1928 – July 22, 1992) was a Soviet geologist. He worked in comparative planetology and the geochemistry of space. He was director of the V. I. Vernadsky Institute of Geochemistry from 1976 to 1992. In 1987 he received the V. I. Vernadsky Gold Medal for his work. A crater on Mars was named after him.

References

1928 births
1992 deaths
Communist Party of the Soviet Union members
Full Members of the Russian Academy of Sciences
Full Members of the USSR Academy of Sciences

Recipients of the Order of Friendship of Peoples
Recipients of the Order of Lenin
Recipients of the Order of the Red Banner of Labour
Recipients of the USSR State Prize
Russian geochemists
Russian geologists
Soviet geochemists
Soviet geologists
Burials at Novodevichy Cemetery